Alexandre Florent (4 February 1849, Lyon - 1 December 1922) was a French Blanquist socialist politician. He was a member of the Chamber of Deputies from 1898 to 1902.

References

1849 births
1922 deaths
Politicians from Lyon
Socialist Revolutionary Party (France) politicians
Members of the 7th Chamber of Deputies of the French Third Republic